Patriarch Jeremias of Constantinople may refer to:

 Jeremias I of Constantinople, Ecumenical Patriarch in 1522–1524 and 1525–1546
 Jeremias II of Constantinople, Ecumenical Patriarch in 1572–1579, 1580–1584 and 1587–1595
 Jeremias III of Constantinople, Ecumenical Patriarch in 1716–1726 and 1732–1733